William Manson Docker (January 31, 1891 – 1960) was a Scottish-born businessman and politician in Ontario, Canada. He represented Kenora in the Legislative Assembly of Ontario from 1943 to 1948 as a Co-operative Commonwealth Federation (CCF) member.

The son of William Docker and Annie Manson, he was born in Govan and was educated in Scotland. Docker came to Canada in 1934. In 1938, he married Alma Tidman. He was the manager of a dry goods store.

References

External links

1891 births
1960 deaths
20th-century Canadian politicians
Ontario Co-operative Commonwealth Federation MPPs
British emigrants to Canada